Doru Nicolae (born 22 March 1952) is a Romanian former professional footballer who played as a forward. He was one of few Romanian footballers who was transferred in a foreign country during the communist regime. Nicolae played seven games at international level for Romania.

Honours
Argeș Pitești
 Divizia A: 1978–79
Panathinaikos
 Greek Cup: 1981–82

References

External links
 
 
 

1952 births
Living people
Footballers from Bucharest
Romanian footballers
Association football forwards
Olympic footballers of Romania
Liga I players
FC Petrolul Ploiești players
FC Steaua București players
FC Dinamo București players
FC Argeș Pitești players
FC Bihor Oradea players
CS Universitatea Craiova players
Liga II players
ACF Gloria Bistrița players
Super League Greece players
Panathinaikos F.C. players
Romanian expatriate footballers
Romanian expatriate sportspeople in Greece
Expatriate footballers in Greece
Romania international footballers